Patrik Hučko (born January 6, 1973) is a Czech former professional ice hockey defenceman.

Hučko played in the Czech Extraliga for HC Zlín, HC Železárny Třinec, HC Slezan Opava, HC České Budějovice and HC Lasselsberger Plzeň. He won a league championship with Zlín in 2004.

He also played in the Deutsche Eishockey Liga for Starbulls Rosenheim, the SM-liiga for HIFK, the Russian Superleague for HC Neftekhimik Nizhnekamsk and the Elitserien for Leksands IF.

References

External links

1973 births
Living people
AIK IF players
HL Anyang players
Motor České Budějovice players
Czech ice hockey defencemen
Fischtown Pinguins players
HIFK (ice hockey) players
Hvidovre Ligahockey players
SHK Hodonín players
Leksands IF players
EHC Black Wings Linz players
MHk 32 Liptovský Mikuláš players
HC Neftekhimik Nizhnekamsk players
Nybro Vikings players
Nyköpings Hockey players
HC Oceláři Třinec players
People from Uherské Hradiště
HC Plzeň players
HC ZUBR Přerov players
HC Slezan Opava players
Starbulls Rosenheim players
PSG Berani Zlín players
Sportspeople from the Zlín Region
Czechoslovak ice hockey defencemen
Czech expatriate ice hockey players in Germany
Czech expatriate ice hockey players in Slovakia
Czech expatriate ice hockey players in Sweden
Czech expatriate ice hockey players in Finland
Czech expatriate ice hockey players in Russia
Czech expatriate sportspeople in Austria
Slovak expatriate sportspeople in South Korea
Czech expatriate sportspeople in Denmark
Expatriate ice hockey players in Austria
Expatriate ice hockey players in South Korea
Expatriate ice hockey players in Denmark